1981 Dakar Rally also known as the 1981 Paris–Dakar Rally was the 3rd running of the Dakar Rally event. The car class was won by René Metge and Bernard Giroux. The motorcycle class was won by Hubert Auriol.

Cars

Stages

References

Dakar Rally
D
1981 in African sport
1981 in French motorsport